Şivekar Sultan ("flirty", died;  1647 or 1693), was the seventh haseki of Sultan Ibrahim (reign 16401648) of the Ottoman Empire.

Life
She was from Armenian descent. Her real name was Maria, and she was the daughter of a wealthy Armenian merchant. 

Şivekar Sultan was morbidly obese. In 1646, Ibrahim appointed his servants to look for the "fattest woman" in Ḳosṭanṭīnīye. Upon this order, they started to search for palace officials and eventually found an Armenian woman in Üsküdar. Maria became his consort and he gave her the name Şivekar, meaning "flirty". She was the given the title of Seventh Haseki. She had a good relation with Cinci Hoca Pasha and later with the Eight Haseki Hümaşah Sultan. 

She was politically active during Ibrahim's last years. Ibrahim soon became mentally ill, and Şivekar helped sooth his tensions. She was among the strongest consorts of Ibrahim in the Ottoman Harem's politics. She gave birth to a son, named Şehzade Cihangir, in 1646, who died in infancy. In addition, all Damascus revenues were donated to Şivekar Sultan.

According to some historians, in 1647 Şivekar was responsible for the death of all the members of Ibrahim's harem. Şivekar spread the gossip that one of the Sultan's concubines had been in an affair with an outsider of the palace. Ibrahim believed her and tortured many members of the harem to say a name, but to no avail. Ibrahim ordered that all his two hundred eighty of his low-ranked concubines be put in sacks and thrown in the Bosporus. He only spared his Haseki Sultans. Only one concubine was saved by a passing ship. Kösem Sultan was furious when she knew about the incident, and summoned Şivekar to her rooms where she would have dinner with Kösem. Kösem killed Şivekar by poisoning her and told an inconsolable Ibrahim that Şivekar died of natural causes.

However, it must be specified that, even if can be true that Şivekar died in 1647 (although other sources indicate that she died in Old Palace in 1693), the anecdote of the massacre of the concubines seems at least uncertain as coming from unreliable sources, and it is denied by many historians, who argue that Kösem, if she was really behind the woman's death, may have poisoned her rather for her influence on Ibrahim and the threat to her own power, as she risked raising the son against the mother.

Şivekar Sultan founded some foundations and vakfs in her lifetime. 

Today, she is buried inside the Ibrahim I Mausoleum at Hagia Sophia in Istanbul.

Issue 
By Ibrahim, Şivekar Sultan had a son:

 Şehzade Cihangir (14 December 1646 - 1 December 1648). Born and died in Topkapi Palace, Constantinople.

In popular culture
In the 2015 Turkish historical fiction TV series Muhteşem Yüzyıl: Kösem, Şivekar Sultan is portrayed by Turkish actress Gümeç Alpay Aslan.

References

Sources

17th-century consorts of Ottoman sultans
1620s births
1640s deaths
People from the Ottoman Empire of Armenian descent
Armenian royalty